Neocollyris saphyrina is a species of ground beetle in the genus Neocollyris in the subfamily Carabinae. It was described by Chaudoir in 1850.

References

Saphyrina, Neocollyris
Beetles described in 1850